Pooja Kanwal Mahtani is an Indian actress who has worked predominately in Kannada-language films and Hindi television. She played lead roles in the Kannada films Seven O' Clock and Tirupathi. She appeared in Palampur Express where she portrayed the lead role of Pawni. She is currently working with Aajtak & India Today Group.

Personal life
She is a daughter of Anita Kanwal.

On 6 November 2009 she married a Bandra-based jeweler, Avinash Mahtani.

Filmography

Film

Television 
 Palampur Express as Paavni
 Sasural Genda Phool as Disha
 Rishtey (season 2)
 Na Bole Tum... Na Maine Kuch Kaha as Rashmi
 Hum Ne Li Hai- Shapath as Simran Kaur
 Sanskaar - Dharohar Apno Ki (season 2) as Deepika
 Gulmohar Grand as Mayuri Jaitley/Mayuri Mehta
Saas Bahu Aur Betiyan as Host

Dubbing roles

Live action films

References

External links 

Living people
Indian women television presenters
Indian television presenters
Indian film actresses
Year of birth missing (living people)
Actresses in Kannada cinema